Joseph Bellinger (1773January 10, 1830) was a slave owner and U.S. Representative from South Carolina. He was born at the Bellinger Plantation in Saint Bartholomew Parish, Ashepoo in Colleton County in the Province of South Carolina and was a planter by trade. He owned the "Aeolian Lawn" slave plantation.

He served as member of the State house of representatives from 1802–1809 and of the State senate from Barnwell District 1810–1813. Bellinger was elected as a Democratic-Republican to the Fifteenth Congress (March 4, 1817 – March 3, 1819).
He was not a candidate for reelection to the Sixteenth Congress.

He died at Charleston, South Carolina on January 10, 1830, aged around 56 years old.
He was interred in the Bellinger private burial ground, Poco Sabo Plantation, Ashepoo, South Carolina.

References

Sources

1773 births
1830 deaths
Farmers from South Carolina
American planters
South Carolina state senators
Members of the South Carolina House of Representatives
Politicians from Charleston, South Carolina
Democratic-Republican Party members of the United States House of Representatives from South Carolina